
Gmina Lipno is a rural gmina (administrative district) in Lipno County, Kuyavian-Pomeranian Voivodeship, in north-central Poland. Its seat is the town of Lipno, although the town is not part of the territory of the gmina.

Villages
Gmina Lipno contains the villages and settlements of Barany, Białowieżyn, Biskupin, Brzeźno, Chlebowo, Chodorążek, Głodowo, Grabiny, Huta Głodowska, Ignackowo, Jankowo, Jastrzębie, Karnkowo, Karnkowskie Rumunki, Kłokock, Kolankowo, Komorowo, Krzyżówki, Lipno, Łochocin, Maliszewo, Okrąg, Ośmiałowo, Ostrowite, Ostrowitko, Piątki, Popowo, Radomice, Rumunki Głodowskie, Tomaszewo, Trzebiegoszcz, Wichowo, Wierzbick, Zbytkowo and Złotopole.

Neighbouring gminas
Gmina Lipno is bordered by the town of Lipno and by the gminas of Bobrowniki, Chrostkowo, Czernikowo, Fabianki, Kikół, Skępe and Wielgie.

References
Polish official population figures 2006

Lipno
Gmina Lipno